Heritage Hall may refer to:

Heritage Hall (Valparaiso University)
Old U.S. Post Office (Marion, Ohio), also known as Heritage Hall, listed on the National Register of Historic Places
Heritage Hall (University of Southern California), at University of Southern California
Heritage Hall (Vancouver), a designated heritage building in Vancouver
Heritage Hall (Indianapolis), a building within the Lockerbie Square Historic District

Architectural disambiguation pages